Punctozotroctes is a genus of beetles in the family Cerambycidae, containing the following species:

 Punctozotroctes bolivianus Martins & Galileo, 2007
 Punctozotroctes chemsaki Tavakilian & Neouze, 2007
 Punctozotroctes feuilleti Tavakilian & Neouze, 2007
 Punctozotroctes guianensis Tavakilian & Neouze, 2007
 Punctozotroctes hovorei Tavakilian & Neouze, 2007
 Punctozotroctes inhamum Martins, Galileo & Limeira-de-Olveira, 2009
 Punctozotroctes nordestinus Martins & Galileo, 2007
 Punctozotroctes tuberculatus Galileo & Martins, 2011
 Punctozotroctes wappesi Tavakilian & Neouze, 2007

References

Acanthoderini